Jalandhar is the third most-populous city in the Indian state of Punjab and the largest city in Doaba region. Jalandhar lies alongside the Grand Trunk Road and is a well-connected rail and road junction. Jalandhar is about 381 km (230 miles) from national capital Delhi. The famous road NH1 crosses from Jalandhar.

History

The history of Jalandhar District comprises three periods — ancient, medieval and modern.

The city may be named after Jalandhara, a Nath Guru, who was from here. . The city was founded by Devasya Verma as mentioned in Vedas. Other possibilities include that it was the capital of the kingdom of Lava, son of Rama or that the name derives from the vernacular term Jalandhar, meaning area inside the water, i.e., tract lying between the two rivers Satluj and Beas. The whole of Punjab and the area of present Jalandhar District was part of the Indus Valley Civilization. Harappa and Mohenjo-daro are the sites where remains of the Indus Valley civilization have been found extensively. The archaeological explorations made during recent years have pushed the ancient times of Jalandhar District of Harappa period.

Jalandhar and the Doaba may have been conquered around 1070 by the Ghaznavids during the reign of Ibrahim of Ghazni. It later formed part of the province of Lahore during the Delhi Sultanate and Mughal Empire. The 18th century saw upheaval in Jalandhar amidst an anarchy caused by the disintegration of the Mughals and power struggles involving Persians, Afghans and Sikhs. It was captured by the Faizullahpuria Misl in 1766, and in 1811 Maharaja Ranjit Singh incorporated it within the Sikh Empire.

In 1849, following the annexation of the Punjab by the East India Company, the city of Jalandhar, written in English as Jullundur by Company officials, became the headquarters of the Division and District of the same name. In 1858 Company rule in India ended and the city became part of the British Raj. In the mid to late 19th century, the Punjab administration regarded Jullundur as too densely populated and farmed to capacity. This led to the district being a chief recruitment area for settlers to colonise the newly irrigated Punjab Canal Colonies in western Punjab.

The Khilafat Movement started in the district in early 1920 to bring pressure on the government to change their policy towards Turkey. Mahatma Gandhi extended sympathy and support to this movement however in response the District was declared a 'Proclaimed Area' under the Seditious Meetings Act. In 1924, Pakistani general and military dictator Muhammad Zia-ul-Haq was born in the city.

Prior to the partition of India, Muslims were in plurality in Jalandhar. According to 1941 census, Muslims made up 45.2% of the population, compared to Hindus and Sikhs being 27.6% and 26.5% respectively. Within a period of 10 years, from 1941 to 1951, Muslim population in Jalandhar reduced from 45.2% to 0.2%.

Climate
The city has a humid subtropical climate with cool winters and long, hot summers. Summers last from April to June and winters from November to February. The climate is dry on the whole, except during the brief southwest monsoon season during July and August. The average annual rainfall is about 70 cm. In 2018, Jalandhar witnessed Heavy rainfall, with over 20% increase from average rainfall. Since it is in the northern plains, it feels really cold during winters and very hot during summers.

Demographics

Population

As per provisional data of 2011 census Jalandhar had a population of 873,725, of which 463,975 were male and 409,750 female.

Literacy
The literacy rate was 86.22 per cent. For males and females respectively the literacy rate was 88.82% and 83.30%

Religion

As per the census of 2011, Hinduism and Sikhism are the religions of the vast majority of people in Jalandhar.

Economy
Jalandhar has been selected in the second phase of the smart city project and 200 crores have been allocated to the municipal corporation for initializing the project.

Jalandhar exports goods like furniture and glass to neighboring cities, and is a global hub for the manufacture of sporting equipment. Jalandhar is famous for its sports industry and equipment manufactured in Jalandhar has been used in many international sporting games including Olympics, Commonwealth Games, Asian Games, among others. It is also a hub for manufacturing of hand tools.
Jalandhar is also famous for its leather industry, leather for footwear, leather goods, furniture being sold to export houses located at Delhi, Agra, Kanpur and other Indian cities. Together with hand tools it is a major production centre of industrial tool bags being used by workmen in America and Europe.

Many new malls and shopping complexes are being established at a very rapid pace and as such is also a hub of the NRI's many of whom are from the Jalandhar region.

Transport

By air
The nearest airport is Adampur Airport, northwest of Jalandhar which currently handles only scheduled operation on maiden flights of private carrier Spicejet to Delhi, Mumbai and Jaipur. The nearest fully-fledged International Airport is Sri Guru Ram Dass Jee International Airport in Amritsar. It is second busiest airport in North India, and is connected to other parts of the country by regular flights. Several airlines operate flights from abroad, including London Stansted, Birmingham, Dubai, Singapore, Kuala Lumpur and Doha. The airport handles as many as 48 flights every week up from the occasional, intermittent ones some years ago.

By rail
Direct train service is available for other major cities like Mumbai, Calcutta, Chennai, Patna, Guwahati, Pune, Haridwar, Varanasi, Jaipur, Jhansi, Gwalior, Bhopal and Jammu Tawi. Some prestigious trains that halt in Jalandhar City railway station are Howrah Mail, Golden Temple Mail (Frontier Mail), New-Delhi Amritsar Shatabdi Express, Paschim Express. Now many trains of Jammu route are extended up to Mata Vaishno Devi-Katra.

Jalandhar City Railway Station is well-connected to other parts of the country, Jalandhar City is a major stop between the Amritsar-Delhi rail link which is serviced by Shatabdi Express, Intercity Express, and others

Direct Service to major cities such as Mumbai, Calcutta, Chennai, Patna, Guwahati, Pune, Haridwar, Varanasi, Jaipur and Jammu Tawi are available. There are prestigious services such as the Howrah Mail, Golden Temple Mail (Frontier Mail), New-Delhi Amritsar Shatabdi Express, Paschim Express.

By road
 

There is one of the largest networks of bus services of Punjab at Shaheed-e-Azam Sardar Bhagat Singh ISBT (Jalandhar), Himachal Pradesh, Delhi, Haryana, Pepsu, Chandigarh, Uttar Pradesh, Himachal Pradesh, Jammu & Kashmir, Uttrakhand, Rajasthan State Roadways, apart from private operators.

Religious places
 Gurudwara Dukh Niwaran Sahib
 Guru Ravidass Dham
 Devi talab mandir
 Nakodar Darbar Baba Murad Shah Ji
 Cantonment Church
 Dera Sachkand Ballan
 Gurudwara sahib ji
 Gurdwara Guru Tegh Bahadur Nagar
 Geeta Mandir Jalandhar

Leisure

 Niku Park
Prithvi's Planet
Smmash
Wonder Land

Media

Doordarshan Kendra, Jalandhar is an Indian television station in Jalandhar, owned and operated by state-owned Doordarshan, the television network of Prasar Bharati (Broadcasting Corporation of India). It was established in 1979 and produces and broadcasts the 24-hour Punjabi language TV channel, DD Punjabi, which was launched in 1998 and covers most of the state of Punjab, India.

The city is the region's headquarters for newspapers, national television and radio stations. These include Daily Ajit, Jagbani, Punjab Kesari, Dainik Bhaskar, Dainik Jagran, Hindustan Times, The Tribune, Truescoop News, Hind Samachar,  etc.

State-owned All India Radio has a local station in Jalandhar that transmits programs of mass interest. FM local radio stations include:
 Radio city 91.9 MHz
 BIG FM 92.7 92.7 MHz
 94.3 FM-My Fm- 94.3 MHz
 Radio Mirchi 98.3 MHz
All India Radio 102.7 MHz

Healthcare
The Municipal Corporation of Jalandhar claims that the city has over 800 hospitals,
 that makes it the city with the highest number of hospitals in 
per capita in Asia. Three new Health Centres were set up in Jalandhar on 9 September 2020.

Sports

Cricket
Cricket is very popular in grounds and streets of the city. There is an international-standard stadium at Gandhi Stadium formerly known as Burlton Park. The Indian cricket team played a Test Match against the Pakistan cricket team on this ground on 24 September 1983.

Kabaddi
Major Kabaddi matches are usually held at Guru Gobind Singh Stadium.

Guru Gobind Singh Stadium
Guru Gobind Singh Stadium is a multi-purpose stadium in Jalandhar. It is usually used mostly for football matches and served as the home stadium of JCT Mills FC. People can be seen jogging, playing soccer, weight-lifting, etc. in the stadium most of the time. The Punjab government has started new projects at the stadium.

Surjit Hockey Stadium
Surjeet Hockey Stadium is a field hockey stadium in Jalandhar, Punjab, India. It is named after Jalandhar-born Olympian Surjit Singh. This stadium is home of the franchise Sher-e-Punjab of the World Series Hockey.

Sports college
There is a Government Sports College in the city and it is a focus for many of the National Sports Councils. In this college, many sports are played like cricket, hockey, swimming, volleyball and basketball.

Education

Higher education institutions include

Universities
 DAV Institute of Engineering & Technology
 DAV University
 Doaba College
 GNA University
 Guru Nanak Dev University Regional Campus
 Lovely Professional University
 Kanya Maha Vidyalaya
 Lyallpur Khalsa College for Women
 Lyallpur Khalsa College
 Khalsa College
 Mata Gujri Institute of Nursing
 Mehr Chand Polytechnic College
 NIT Jalandhar
 Punjab Institute of Medical Sciences
 Punjab Technical University
 D.A.V. College, Jalandhar

Schools

 BSF School Jalandhar Cantt
 Kendriya Vidyalaya No. 1, Jalandhar Cantonment
 St Joseph's Boys' School, Jalandhar, Defence Colony
 
 Apeejay School, Mahavir Marg 
 Apeejay School, Rama Mandi
 British Olivia Sr. Sec. School, Jalandhar
 Cambridge Innovative School, Urban Estate Phase-II
MGN Public School, Adarsh Nagar
 MGN Public School, Urban Estate Phase-II
 SD Model School Jalandhar Cantt
 Shiv Jyoti Public School
 Swami Sant Dass Public School

Jalandhar Cantonment

Notable people

Notes

References

External links
 
 
 
 

 
Cities and towns in Jalandhar district
Former capital cities in India